Corispermum ulopterum is a species of flowering plant in the family Amaranthaceae, native to Irkutsk Oblast in Siberia. It is found only on the beaches of Lake Baikal.

References

Amaranthaceae
Endemic flora of Russia
Flora of Irkutsk Oblast
Plants described in 1849